The American Dog Derby is a dogsled race held in Ashton, Idaho, on the third weekend of February.  It is the oldest dogsled race in the United States.  The first American Dog Derby was held in 1917.  It was tremendously popular in the 1920s through the 1950s.  Interest waned in the 1960s and the race was discontinued for several years.  It was revived in 1993 and continues to grow in popularity.

History

First American Dog Derby
The dog sledding tradition in Ashton owes its existence to Union Pacific Railroad.  Ashton was founded and constructed with the coming of railroad in 1906.  The construction of the Yellowstone Branch continued from Ashton into the high country of Island Park and completed at West Yellowstone in 1908.  A few years later, the Teton Valley Branch, was constructed from Ashton into the Lamont and Teton Valley areas and completed to Victor in 1912.  Due to the deep snows, however, these two railroads were closed down in winter and not plowed until spring.  This made Ashton the wintertime rail terminus for the entire region.  In winter, mail, people, and supplies could only be transported to developments in these high country areas via dog sled.  By 1917, mushing, in Ashton, was a serious business with dozens carving out a living training and maintaining dog sled teams that transported mail, people, and supplies to the high country in winter.

The idea for the first dog sled race has a traditional history that a popular barber in Ashton, named Jay Ball, dreamed it up after reading about the All-Alaska Sweepstakes in Nome, Alaska and the new Hudson Bay Dog Derby in Las Pas, Manitoba, Canada that began the year before in 1916.  Two of the four founders of the American Dog Derby were direct employees of Union Pacific Railroad and that Union Pacific spent tens of thousands of dollars promoting the American Dog Derby over the following decades and made it a wildly popular international event and made several mushers international celebrities.  A popular female musher named Lydia Hutchinson even starred in a movie.

The rules for the American Dog Derby would be based on those of the Hudson Bay Dog Derby, the course would be the unplowed Yellowstone Branch railroad from West Yellowstone to Ashton, and the date would be Sunday, March 4, 1917.  Promoters must have been pleased when 16 teams registered in Ashton between February 25 and March 1 for the first big race.  All were local.  There were two teams from Harriman’s Railroad Ranch, one team from the Utida Gun Club, one from the Trude Ranch, several from West Yellowstone, one team from Henry’s Lake, one team from Kilgore, one team from Spencer, two from Marysville, one team from the Mesa Hunting Lodge, and several teams from Ashton.  It looked to be a grand affair.

The heavy snows started falling in Island Park the beginning of March.  Between 20 and 40 inches of fresh snow fell by the 3rd.  It was deep and soft enough that only four teams were able to make their way through Island Park to the starting point at West Yellowstone.  In spite of the elimination of 12 of the 16 entrants, things went well, Sunday morning, for the remaining four teams at the start of this 55-mile run down to Ashton.  It was still snowing, however, and at 8 miles, assenting to Rea’s Pass on the Continental Divide, the teams encountered 20 more inches of new light powdery snow.  They took turns at breaking trail.  At 14 miles and entering Island Park near Big Springs, the winds began to blow and the snow storm became a blizzard.  The mushing became even slower and more exhausting but the four teams pushed on through the flat Island Park country all day in the blizzard.  With fading daylight, the teams realized that an exciting finish before a cheering crowd was not to be.  They finally holed up for the night at a fish hatchery on Warm River at the 40 mile mark.
  

Meanwhile, in Ashton, the spectators waiting for them in the milder climes of the valley were having a pretty good time.  It was described as a “large” crowd by the papers but the numbers were tiny when compared to those of following years.  They watched or participated in the many other events of the American Dog Derby such as ski races, ski jumping, and a 200-yard boy’s dog sled race.  Each “team” in the Boy’s Race consisted of one boy, one sled, and one dog.  There were 15 teams, and at one point, it was reported, all 15 dogs were in one big fight with all 15 boys trying to untangle them.  It was all great fun and, though going home and not seeing the big race finish, most spectators had a wonderful time and would be back the following year.  Next morning, the four stranded teams at the fish hatchery raced down the Warm River grade, into the valley, and ran the final few miles into Ashton.  Tud Kent, one of the four original organizers, racing for Harriman’s Railroad Ranch, was the first winner of the American Dog Derby, winning by over 20 minutes.  He did this while breaking trail and would go on to win five more Dog Derbies for a total of six.  This was more wins than any other musher.

The race was promoted and held again the following year but in a figure-eight course in the valley around Ashton where 40 inch snowfalls are less common.  By the early 1920s, the American Dog Derby attracted crowds estimated at 10 to 15 thousand and had officially displaced the All-Alaska Sweepstakes as the American Championship race.  In fact, the All-Alaska Sweepstakes held its last race in 1919 making the American Dog Derby the oldest surviving American dog sled race.  The American Dog Derby became so internationally popular, it would be considered the World Championship in dog sled racing.  The prize money growing to $1000 in the 1920s would be equivalent to $130,000 today.  With the wild success, the glamour, and the international press coverage of the American Dog Derby, dog sledding was popularized and dozens of other dog sled races soon sprang up across America, Canada, and in Europe making dog sled racing what it is today.

See also
 Carting
 Dogsled racing
 Iditarod Trail Sled Dog Race
 Klondike 500
 List of sled dog races
 Mushing
 Pro Sprint Tour
 Sled dog
 Yukon Quest

References

External links
 

Dog sledding races
Recurring sporting events established in 1917
Tourist attractions in Fremont County, Idaho
1917 establishments in the United States